Sybil Kein (also known as Consuela Provost, born 29 September 1939) is a Louisiana Creole poet, playwright, scholar, and musician.

Provost was born Consuela Marie Moore on 29 September 1939. She largely created the field of Creole Studies through her early publications and presentations. A protégé of Robert Hayden, her poetry is housed in the National Archives, Library of Congress. In 1981 Provost published Gombo People, a volume of poetry representing the first contribution to American letters of original literature in the Louisiana Creole language.

Provost has been named "Chercheur Associe" of the Sorbonne in Paris, France for her work in Creole culture; and distinguished "Professeur Émérite" of The University of Michigan. She is also the recipient of a Hopwood Award.

Her recent works include Delta Dancer, Serenade Creole, Creole Journal, Creole: The History and Legacy of Louisiana‘s Free People of Color, An American South, Creole Ballads, Zydeco, Maw-Maw’s Creole Lullaby and Other Songs for Children, Creole Classique, Love is Forever: Songs of Romantic New Orleans, Gombo People and Gardenias y Rosas: Canciones Romanticas (a musical companion to Gumbo People).

Provost now resides in Natchitoches, Louisiana.

External links

The Creole Heritage Center

References

Louisiana Creole people
University of Paris people
University of Michigan faculty
Living people
1939 births